Ki no Iratsume (紀女郎) was a Japanese noblewoman, princess consort and waka poet of the Nara period.

Biography 
Ki no Iratsume's actual given name was Oshika (小鹿 or 少鹿); iratsume means "daughter" or "young woman". It is unknown when she was born, but her father was the Nara-period courtier Ki no Shikahito (紀鹿人).  She was married to Prince Aki.  The date of her death is unknown.

Poetry 
Twelve of Ki no Iratsume's poems were included in the Man'yōshū. They are the poems numbered 643, 644, 645, 762, 763, 776, 782, 1452, 1460, 1461, 1648, and 1661, all of them tanka.

Notes

References

Citations

Works cited 

 
 
 
 

8th-century Japanese poets
Man'yō poets
Japanese women poets
Ki clan